Steven W. Tompkins is an American law enforcement official who has served as the Sheriff of Suffolk County, MA since 2013.

Background
Tompkins received a bachelor's degree in communications from Boston College and a master's degree in public affairs from the University of Massachusetts, Boston. Prior to entering law enforcement, Tompkins was the director of marketing and public affairs at Dimock Community Health Center. Tompkins started working at the Suffolk County Sheriff's Department in 2002 as an chief of external affairs and communications for Sheriff Andrea Cabral. During this time he also served as a political advisor for Senator Elizabeth Warren. He worked on Warren's 2012 Senate campaign.

Suffolk County Sheriff
Tompkins was appointed to the role of Sheriff in 2013 by Governor Deval Patrick to replace Andrea Cabral and was subsequently elected to the position in 2014. He was reelected to the position in 2016. During his tenure Tompkins has been active in state Democractic politics including an unsuccessful run for chair of the Massachusetts Democratic Party. He also received attention as one of several prominent Black officials, along with District Attorney Rachael Rollins and Police Commissioner William G. Gross, in major criminal legal system roles in Boston when their terms overlapped starting in 2019. In 2019 Governor Charlie Baker appointed Tompkins to chair the Roxbury Community College board of trustees.

During the 2020 Democratic Party presidential primaries, Tompkins endorsed Elizabeth Warren's candidacy. He spoke at Warren's formal campaign launch.

ICE Contract
In 2018 Tompkins oversaw the ending of a contract with  Immigration and Customs Enforcement (ICE) which had been active since 2003. At the time the contract ended 182 ICE detainees were incarcerated in Suffolk County facilities and Tompkins began incarcerating women in pretrial detention from Plymouth, Essex, and Norfolk counties in the newly available space in South Bay House of Correction.

Deaths in Suffolk County Jails
Tompkins and the Suffolk County Sheriff's Department has faced pressure from advocates following deaths in Suffolk County jails. In 2021 in particular four deaths in quick succession between July and September of people incarcerated at South Bay House of Correction and Nashua Street Jail sparked protests and calls for transparency and accountability for the circumstances of the deaths. Following these events another person, Charail Premdas, died while incarcerated for a total of five deaths in Suffolk County jails during 2021. In July 2022, the death of Ashley Emma, another person incarcerated at South Bay House of Correction, sparked further protest.

Controversies
In 2015, Tompkins paid a $2,500 fine after admitting to using his badge to improperly coerce eight store owners into taking down signs for his political opponents.

In 2021, Tompkins proposed forced treatment of substance use disorders in Suffolk county facilities for unhoused people in Boston, especially those living in the Mass and Cass neighborhood. He faced criticism for this suggestion by advocates who believed forced treatment in the environment of the criminal legal system was inappropriate. In October 2021 Acting Mayor Kim Janey implemented many elements of this plan through an executive order with actual evictions starting in early November. The evictions garnered further controversy with unhoused people being arrested in line for medication and being sent to jail instead of treatment. The ACLU of Massachusetts also filed a class action lawsuit to stop arrests of unhoused people in the area.

In 2023, Tompkins paid a $12,300 fine for breaking state ethics law by creating a paid position for his niece and making his staff do his personal errands.

Personal life
Tompkins' wife, Suzanne Tompkins, passed away in 2016 from complications of systemic lupus.

Electoral history

See also
South Bay House of Correction
Nashua Street Jail

References 

Sheriffs of Suffolk County, Massachusetts
Morrissey College of Arts & Sciences alumni
University of Massachusetts Boston alumni
Massachusetts Democrats
Year of birth missing (living people)
Living people
Massachusetts sheriffs